Svetlana Varganova (born 19 November 1964) is a Russian former swimmer who competed in the 1980 Summer Olympics.

She got a silver in the 200 metre breaststroke with a time of 2:29.61

References

1964 births
Living people
Russian female breaststroke swimmers
Olympic swimmers of the Soviet Union
Swimmers at the 1980 Summer Olympics
Olympic silver medalists for the Soviet Union
World Aquatics Championships medalists in swimming
Medalists at the 1980 Summer Olympics
Olympic silver medalists in swimming
Soviet female breaststroke swimmers